Oumayma Ben Maaouia, also known as Oumayma Maaouia, is a Tunisian former footballer and current manager. She played as a midfielder and has been a member of the Tunisia women's national team.

Club career
Ben Maaouia has played for Tunis Air Club in Tunisia.

International career
Ben Maaouia capped for Tunisia at senior level during two Africa Women Cup of Nations qualifications (2012 and 2014).

International goals
Scores and results list United Arab Emirates goal tally first

Scores and results list Tunisia goal tally first

See also
List of Tunisia women's international footballers

References

External links

Living people
Tunisian women's footballers
Women's association football midfielders
Tunisia women's international footballers
Tunisian football managers
Women's association football managers
Female association football managers
Tunisian emigrants to the United Arab Emirates
Naturalized citizens of the United Arab Emirates
Emirati women's footballers
United Arab Emirates women's international footballers
Dual internationalists (women's football)
Emirati people of Tunisian descent
Year of birth missing (living people)